Saint John Alexandrovich Kochurov, hieromartyr of the Soviet revolution, was one of a number of young educated priests who came to the United States in the late 1890s as missionaries among the émigrés from Carpathian Ruthenia and Galicia. He was active in establishing parishes and aiding communities, mainly in the Midwest. After returning to Russia he was assigned to Estonia where he put into action the teaching skills he learned in America before he was assigned in 1916 to Tsarskoe Selo. Here he was killed during the early days of the Bolshevik revolution.  His feast day is celebrated on October 31.  He is also commemorated on the Synaxis of the first martyrs of the American lands on December 12 and on the feast of the New Martyrs and Confessors of Russia, celebrated on the Sunday nearest to January 25, which was the date of the martyrdom of Metropolitan Vladimir of Kiev, the first of the new martyrs.

Early years 
John Kochurov was born on June 13, 1871. His father was a priest. His education included attendance at the Ryazan Theological Seminary before continuing at the St. Petersburg Theological Academy. He excelled at his studies at both the seminary and academy.

After graduating in 1895, Fr. John married and then entered his life's work when he was ordained deacon. On August 27, 1895, he was ordained a priest at the St. Alexander Nevsky Lavra in St. Petersburg by Bishop Nicholas (Ziorov) of the Diocese of the Aleutians and Alaska.

America

Having expressed the desire to be a missionary priest in the United States, Fr. John was soon transferred and became the first permanent priest at St. Vladimir's Church in Chicago. This parish was later to become the Holy Trinity Cathedral. As St. Vladimir's parish did not yet have their own building, his first major project was construction of the church building. Under the guidance of Bishop Tikhon, later Patriarch Tikhon of Moscow and saint, Fr. John enlisted the services of the noted architect Louis Sullivan to design the church. To finance the project, Fr. John sought and obtained donations from Tsar Nicholas II as well as from a few Americans, notably Harold Fowler McCormick and Charles R. Crane who was the American ambassador to China. Construction of the church began in April 1902 and was completed the next year for the consecration by Bishop Tikhon.

Fr. John devoted much effort to aiding the establishment of other parishes in the Chicago area. He performed the first service for the future Archangel Michael Orthodox Church in southwest Chicago. In the Chicago area he was active in the formation of the parishes in Madison, Streator, and Joliet (all in Illinois), as well as aiding the parishes in Buffalo, NY, and Hartshorne, OK.

His presence at the consecration of an Episcopalian (aka Anglican) bishop long predates the anathema against ecumenism of 1982 and does not fall under it.

On the social side of parish life, he, with Fr. Alexis Toth, future Saint Alexis of Wilkes-Barre, was influential in the establishment of a major Orthodox mutual aid society that provided support for the many newly arrived immigrants. He also translated religious texts into English, looking to the time when the church in America would consist of English-speaking members. Before his return to Russia, Fr. John helped to organize the first All-American Council that was held in Mayfield, Pennsylvania, in 1907.

Russia and martyrdom
Fr, John returned to Russia in 1907 where he was assigned to Narva (now Estonia). Here he put to use the skills he had learned in the United States teaching catechism in the schools.

Then in 1916, he was transferred to St. Catherine's Cathedral in Tsarskoye Selo, just outside St. Petersburg. At St. Catherine's, he established himself as a popular priest who was skilled in presenting moving sermons. Then in October 1917 the Bolshevik uprising in St. Petersburg spilled over quickly into Tsarskoye Selo as the town was attacked by Bolshevik elements. The people thronged to the churches where the clergy held prayer services and led processions throughout the town praying for peace.

On October 31, 1917 (Old Style), the Bolsheviks entered Tsarskoe Selo in force and arrested Fr. John. He was taken by the Bolsheviks out of town where he was summarily shot. By this act, Fr. John became the proto-hieromartyr of the Bolshevik revolution and the Soviet yoke. Fr. John was buried several days later in the crypt of St. Catherine's Cathedral.

In December 1994, Fr. John was glorified by the Council of Bishops of the Russian Orthodox Church, in session at St. Daniel's Monastery, Moscow, Russia, as the first of the new martyrs of the 20th century. In the United States he is also honored as a missionary and inspired preacher.

Hymns
Troparion (Tone 1)
Aflame with love for God,
You gave your life as a martyr for Christ and neighbor;
O Hieromartyr, John,
Entreat the Most Merciful God
To preserve the Holy Church in peace and save our souls.

Kontakion (Tone 8)
As you zealously fulfilled your pastoral service,
You brought your soul to God as a well-pleasing sacrifice, O Father John.
Entreat Christ God to grant peace to the world and great mercy to our souls.

References

External links
Priestmartyr John Kochurov from OCA web site.
John Kochurov at Find A Grave 

1871 births
1917 deaths
Russian saints
People from Streator, Illinois
20th-century Eastern Orthodox martyrs
20th-century Christian saints
Russian Eastern Orthodox priests
20th-century Eastern Orthodox priests